Brunneifusus is a genus of sea snails, marine gastropod molluscs in the family Melongenidae, the crown conches and their allies.

Species
Species within the genus Brunneifusus include:
 Brunneifusus haszprunari Thach, 2021
 Brunneifusus ternatanus (Gmelin, 1791)
Synonyms
 Brunneifusus carinifer (Habe & Kosuge, 1966): synonym of Brunneifusus ternatanus (Gmelin, 1791)
 Brunneifusus cariniferus (Habe & Kosuge, 1966): synonym of Brunneifusus carinifer (Habe & Kosuge, 1966) (incorrect spelling of specific epithet)

References

 Dekkers A. (2018). Two new genera in the family Melongenidae from the Indo-Pacific and comments on the identity of Hemifusus zhangyii Kosuge, 2008 and Pyrula elongata Lamarck, 1822 (Gastropoda, Neogastropoda: Buccinoidea). Gloria Maris. 57(2): 40-50

External links
 

Melongenidae